A Woman's Place may refer to:

Television episodes
"A Woman's Place" (Blue Heelers), the first episode of the series
"A Woman's Place" (The Handmaid's Tale), the sixth episode of the series
"A Woman's Place" (Time Gentlemen Please), the first episode of the programme

Film
Woman's Place, a 1921 American silent film
A Woman's Place (film), a 2020 documentary film

Books
 A Woman's Place, a booklet by Selma James in 1953.
 Annapurna: A Woman's Place, a book by Arlene Blum.

Places
 A Woman's Place (bookstore), a feminist bookstore in Oakland, California

Organisations
Woman's Place UK, a trans-exclusionary feminist pressure group in the UK